The 2017 KNSB Dutch Allround Championships in speed skating were held in Heerenveen at the Thialf ice skating rink from 20 January to 22 January 2017. The tournament was part of the 2016–2017 speed skating season. Jan Blokhuijsen and Marije Joling won the allround titles.

Schedule

Medalists

Allround

Distance

Classification

Men's allround

Women's allround

Source:

References

KNSB Dutch Allround Championships
KNSB Dutch Allround Championships
2017 Allround
KNSB Dutch Allround Championships, 2017
January 2017 sports events in Europe
2010s in Amsterdam